The Plainfields are a group of three municipalities spanning the convergence of Somerset, Union, and Middlesex Counties in New Jersey, all of which have the word Plainfield in their name. They are the Borough of North Plainfield (Somerset County), City of Plainfield (Union County), and the Borough of South Plainfield (Middlesex County). The towns of Scotch Plains and Fanwood are nearby.

The region was part of the colonial era Elizabethtown Tract and later part of Piscataway settled by Scottish Quakers in the late 16th and early 17th centuries. Among them, was John Laing, whose holdings were known as Plainfield Plantation. It is not certain whether the name derives from the plain clothing worn by the founders or is a reference to the landscape.

While each community has its own independent government, and the three municipalities have no shared governance even at the county level, the term is often used to refer to the area, including on highway exit signs. Signage for Exit 40 on Interstate 78, for example, refers to "The Plainfields" as a destination.

See also
For other groups of similarly named municipalities in New Jersey, see:
The Amboys
The Brunswicks
The Caldwells
The Oranges
The Ridgefields
The Wildwoods

References

 
Scottish-American culture in New Jersey